Odd toed ungulate, or hoofed mammals, such as horses, rhinos, and tapirs, may have their evolutionary origins in Indian subcontinent. While horse remains and related artifacts have been found in Late Harappan (1900-1300 BCE) sites, indicating that horses may have been present at Late Harappan times, horses did not play an essential role in the Harappan civilisation, in contrast to the Vedic period (1500-500 BCE). The importance of the horse for the Indo-Aryans is indicated by the Sanskrit word Ashva, "horse," which is often mentioned in the Vedas and Hindu scriptures.

Paleolithic 
Odd toed ungulate, or hoofed mammals, such as horses, rhinos, and tapirs, may have their evolutionary origins in the Indian Subcontinent. Remains of the Equus namadicus have been found from Pleistocene levels in India. The Equus namadicus is closely related to the Equus sivalensis. The Equus sivalensis lived in the Himalayan foothills in prehistoric times and it is assumed it was extinct during the last ice age.

Domestication

Domestication of the horse before the second millennium appears to be confined to its native habitat, the Great Steppe. An increasing amount of evidence supports the hypothesis that horses were domesticated in the Eurasian Steppes approximately 3500 BCE. Recent discoveries in the context of the Botai culture suggest that Botai settlements in the Akmola Province of Kazakhstan are the location of the earliest domestication of the horse.

Use of horses spread across Eurasia for transportation, agricultural work, and warfare. The horse only appears in Mesopotamia from around 1800 BC as a ridden animal and acquires military significance with the invention of the chariot.

Indus Valley Civilisation
Proponents of Indigenous Aryanism believe that the Indus Valley civilisation was Aryan and Vedic. There are two common objections against such a correlation: "the Rg Vedic culture was pastoral and horse-centered, while the Harappan culture was neither horse-centered nor pastoral"; and "the complete absence of the modern horse (equus caballus)."  Support for the idea of an indigenous Indo-Aryan origin of the Indus Valley Civilisation mostly exists among Indian scholars of Hindu religion and the history and archaeology of India, and has no support in mainstream scholarship.

The paucity of horse remains in pre-Vedic times could be explained by India's climatic factors which lead to decay of horse bones. Horse bones may also be rare because horses were probably not eaten or used in burials by the Harappans. Remains and artifacts ascribed to domesticated horses are limited to Late Harappan times indicating that horses may have been present at Late Harappan times, "when the Vedic people had settled in the north-west part of the subcontinent." It can therefore not be concluded that the horse was regularly used, or played a significant role, in the Harappan society.

Horse remains from the Harappan site Surkotada (dated to 2400-1700 BC) have been identified by A.K. Sharma as  Equus ferus caballus. The horse specialist Sandor Bökönyi (1997) later confirmed these conclusions, and stated the excavated tooth specimens could "in all probability be considered remnants of true horses [i.e. Equus ferus caballus]". Bökönyi, as cited by B.B. Lal, stated that "The occurrence of true horse (Equus caballus L.) was evidenced by the enamel pattern of the upper and lower cheek and teeth and by the size and form of incisors and phalanges (toe bones)." However, archaeologists like Meadow (1997) disagree, on the grounds that the remains of the Equus ferus caballus horse are difficult to distinguish from other equid species such as Equus asinus (donkeys) or Equus hemionus (onagers).

Colin Renfrew (1999) remarked that "the significance of the horse [...] has been much exaggerated."

Vedic period 

 
Sites such as the BMAC complex are at least as poor in horse remains as the Harappan sites. The earliest undisputed finds of horse remains in South Asia are from the Gandhara grave culture, also known as the Swat culture (c. 1400-800 BCE), related to the Indo-Aryans and coinciding with their arrival in India. Swat valley grave DNA analysis provides evidence of "connections between [Central Asian] Steppe population and early Vedic culture in India".

Horses were of significant importance for the lifestyle of the Indo-Europeans. Ashva, a Sanskrit word for a horse, is one of the significant animals finding references in the Vedas and several Hindu scriptures, and many personal names in the Rig Veda are also centered on horses. Derived from asva, its cognates are found in Indo-European languages like Sanskrit, Avestan, Latin and Greek. There are repeated references to the horse in the Vedas (c. 1500-500 BC). In particular the Rigveda has many equestrian scenes, often associated with chariots. The Ashvamedha or horse sacrifice is a notable ritual of the Yajurveda.

The difficulty of breeding large numbers of horses in the Indian climate meant they needed to be imported in large numbers, usually from Central Asia, but also elsewhere. Horse traders are already mentioned in Atharvaveda 2.30.29. A painting at Ajanta shows horses and elephants that are transported by ship. Trautmann (1982) thus remarked the supply and import of horses has "always" been a preoccupation of the Indians and "it is a structure of its history, then, that India has always been dependent upon western and central Asia for horses."

See also 
Ashvamedha
Ashvins
Early Indians
Domestication of the horse
 Horses in East Asian warfare

Notes

References

Sources 
Printed sources

 

Falconer H. and Cautley, Fauna Antiqua Sivalensis, Being the Fossil Zoology of the Siwalik Highlands in the North of India, 1849, London.

 
 

 
 

 

 </ref>

 

 

 

 
 
 

 

Web-sources

Further reading

External links 

 The Asvamedha Horse of India
 ,  R. Nagaswamy in The Hindu

Horse history and evolution
Social history of India
Horses in India